Salyan is a rural locality (a selo) and the administrative centre of Ispiksky Selsoviet, Suleyman-Stalsky District, Republic of Dagestan, Russia. The population was 95 as of 2010. There are 2 streets.

Geography 
Ispik is the nearest rural locality.

References 

Rural localities in Suleyman-Stalsky District